Thousands On A Raft is the second album by Pete Brown and Piblokto!, released in 1970 on Harvest Records.

Background
The album was the second one on which Brown and guitarist Jim Mullen collaborated. The album was the first to be released in the US in January 1972 on Blue Horizon.

Cover
The album cover shows a model of the Mauretania and Concorde sinking into water alongside beans on toast.

Track listing

Personnel
 Pete Brown – vocals, talking drum, conga
 Jim Mullen – guitar, bass guitar on "Station Song Platform Two", percussion
 Dave Thompson – keyboards, soprano saxophone, Mellotron on "Station Song Platform Two", percussion
 Steve Glover – bass guitar, percussion
 Rob Tait – drums, percussion

References

1970 albums
Harvest Records albums